Tiny Times 3 (Chinese: 小时代：刺金时代) is a 2014 Chinese romantic drama film and the third installment of the Tiny Times franchise directed and written by Guo Jingming. Filming started in Rome on December 10, 2013. The film released on July 17, 2014.

Plot
Gu Li heads to Rome to attend a fashion show. At the insistence of Gong Ming, Lin Xiao follows suit, along with Nan Xiang and Tang Wan Ru. A mad chase thus follows, with the girls touring Rome and meeting all sorts of adventures along the way.

When in Rome, Gu Li runs into her cousin Neil, an Ivy League law student. Suddenly, Lin Xiao receives a call from China, informing her that her cancer-stricken boyfriend, Zhou Chong Guang has died. She flies home for the funeral of her lover, where she sees a Chong Guang lookalike named Lu Shao appearing on the cover of M.E. magazine. This puzzles Lin Xiao who ponders about his true identity.

At the same time, Gu Li's half-brother Gu Zhun appears, claiming to own 20% of the shares of their father's company. As the company has been forcefully acquired by Gu Yuan's mother and Gong Ming, the siblings work together to take back their inheritance.

Cast
 Yang Mi as Lin Xiao
 Kai Ko as Gu Yuan
 Amber Kuo as Gu Li
 Cheney Chen as Zhou Chongguang / Lu Shao (Shaun)
 Bea Hayden Kuo as Nan Xiang
 Evonne Hsieh as Tang Wanru
 Vivian Dawson as Gong Ming
 Lee Hyun-jae as Neil
 Ming Ren as Gu Zhun
 Jiang Chao as Xi Cheng
 Calvin Tu as Wei Hai
 Wang Lin as Ye Chuanping
 Shang Kan as Kitty

Box office
The film grossed RMB111 million (US$17.8 million) on the opening day including midnight release of RMB6.85 million (US$1.10 million). In its third week, it was ranked 6th in the box office, having accumulated a total $82 million after its first 18 days. It earned a total of US$86.9 million.

Original soundtrack

References

External links
 

Chinese sequel films
Films set in Shanghai
Films shot in Shanghai
Films set in Rome
Films shot in Rome
Films based on Chinese novels
2014 films
Adaptations of works by Guo Jingming
Tiny Times
Chinese romantic drama films